The 2006 Tulsa Golden Hurricane football team represented the University of Tulsa in the 2006 NCAA Division I FBS football season. The team's head coach was Steve Kragthorpe, who resigned at the conclusion of the season. They played home games at Skelly Stadium in Tulsa, Oklahoma and competed in the West Division of Conference USA.

Schedule

References

Tulsa
Tulsa Golden Hurricane football seasons
Tulsa Golden Hurricane football